Patrick Ruffini  is a Republican Party pollster and political strategist in the United States. He founded Engage, LLC, a Washington, D.C.-based political media firm, and now runs the political research and intelligence firm, Echelon Insights

Biography

Background
Ruffini grew up in France, Italy, and Greenwich, Connecticut, and graduated high school in 1996 from Greenwich High School. He is a 2000 graduate of the University of Pennsylvania, and currently resides in the Washington, D.C. suburbs.

Career
Ruffini began blogging in 2001, and has been a front-page contributor for RedState and Townhall.com. In the 2004 election, Ruffini served as webmaster for the Bush-Cheney campaign. Following the 2008 election, Ruffini co-authored the Rebuild the Party platform for Republican renewal.

From 2005 to 2007, Ruffini served as eCampaign Director at the Republican National Committee (RNC).

In 2007, Ruffini founded Engage, LLC, a political media firm.

In 2008, he co-founded The Next Right, a forum for the youth conservative movement. Reihan Salam wrote in Atlantic in 2008 that Ruffini "looks poised to become one of the most influential Republican political strategists of his generation." He has authored a monthly "Digital Democracy" column for Townhall magazine, written for National Review, and appeared as a political analyst on Fox News Channel and C-SPAN's Washington Journal. Ruffini's analysis of emerging political trends has also appeared in the Washington Post, the New York Times, CNN, PBS MediaShift, and Newsweek.

In 2009, Ruffini and Engage helped develop the online political strategy for the Bob McDonnell campaign, who won the 2009 Virginia gubernatorial election. In 2010, Ruffini assisted on the Senate campaign of Scott Brown in the Massachusetts special election.

In 2013, he was a signatory to an amicus curiae brief submitted to the U.S. Supreme Court in support of same-sex marriage in the United States during the Hollingsworth v. Perry case.

Works

Articles

See also
 DontGo
 Political consulting

References

Further reading

External links
 Engage LLC website

Blog posts at The Next Right
 

Living people
University of Pennsylvania alumni
Greenwich High School alumni
American political writers
American male non-fiction writers
Washington, D.C., Republicans
Place of birth missing (living people)
1978 births
People from Greenwich, Connecticut
American chief executives
21st-century American non-fiction writers
American male bloggers
American bloggers